The 2014 Japanese Regional Leagues were a competition between parallel association football leagues ranking at the bottom of the Japan Football League.
Statistics of Japanese Regional Leagues in the 2014 season.

Champions list

Hokkaido

Tohoku

Division 1

Division 2 North

Division 2 South

Kantō

Division 1

Division 2

Hokushinetsu

Division 1

Division 2

Tokai

Division 1

Division 2

Kansai

Division 1

Division 2

Chūgoku

Shikoku

Kyushu

References
RSSSF

2014
5